Prem Patra  (Hindi: प्रेमपत्र,  The love letter) is a 1962 Indian Hindi-language romantic drama film produced and directed by Bimal Roy. It stars Shashi Kapoor and Sadhana. The movie is loosely based on the 1956 Bengali film Sagarika starring Uttam Kumar and Suchitra Sen.

Cast
Shashi Kapoor as Arun Kumar Mathur
Sadhana as Kavita Kapoor
 Praveen Choudhary as Ratna
 Seema Deo as Tara
 Chand Usmani as Sunitra
 Rajendra nath as Kedar
 Kanu Roy as Mr.Kapur
Sudhir as Subhash
 Sadhana Khote

Soundtrack

All the songs of the movie had been embellished with music by a well-known composer, Mr. Salil Chaudhary.

References

External links

1960s Hindi-language films
1962 films
Films directed by Bimal Roy
Films scored by Salil Chowdhury
Hindi remakes of Bengali films